Laccodytes is a genus of beetles in the family Dytiscidae, containing the following species:

 Laccodytes americanus Peschet, 1919
 Laccodytes apalodes Guignot, 1955
 Laccodytes olibroides Régimbart, 1895
 Laccodytes phalacroides Régimbart, 1895
 Laccodytes pumilio (LeConte, 1878)

References

Dytiscidae